(also spelled Yezo or Yeso) is the Japanese term historically used to refer to the people and the lands to the northeast of the Japanese island of Honshu. This included the northern Japanese island of Hokkaido, which changed its name from "Ezo" to "Hokkaidō" in 1869, and sometimes included Sakhalin and the Kuril Islands.

In reference to the people of that region, the same two kanji used to write the word Ezo  can also be read Emishi.  The descendants of these people are most likely related to the Ainu people of today.

Etymology
Japanese sources that include an etymology describe Ezo as probably originally a borrowing from the Ainu word  meaning . The term is first attested in Japanese in a text from 1153 in reference to any of the non-Japanese people living in the northeast of Honshū, and then later in 1485 in reference to the northern islands where these people lived, primarily Hokkaido, Karafuto (that is, Sakhalin), and the Kuril Islands.

The kanji spelling is based on the meanings of the characters rather than the phonetics (jukujikun), and is composed of the characters  meaning  and  meaning . The use of the character for  might be in reference to the long "whiskers" (antennae) of these animals, alluding to the prominent beards worn by Ainu men.

The spelling 'Yezo' reflects its pronunciation , when Europeans first came in contact with Japan. It is this historical spelling that is reflected in the scientific Latin term , as in Fragaria yezoensis and Porphyra yezoensis.

History
The first published description of Ezo in the West was brought to Europe by Isaac Titsingh in 1796. His small library of Japanese books included  by Hayashi Shihei. This book, which was published in Japan in 1785, described the Ezo region and its people.

Julius Klaproth was the editor, completing the task which was left incomplete by the death of the book's initial editor, Jean-Pierre Abel-Rémusat.

Subdivisions
The first was the Wajinchi, or 'Japanese Lands', which covered the Japanese settlements on and around the Oshima Peninsula. Ezochi was in turn divided into three sections: North Ezochi, which covered southern Sakhalin; West Ezochi, which included the northern half of Hokkaidō; and East Ezochi, which included the populous southern Hokkaidō and the Kuril Islands.

See also 
Ainu people
Emishi
Republic of Ezo
Jeddo, Japan, a former romanization of the name of Edo, now Tokyo.

Notes

References 
 Cullen, Louis M. (2003).  A History of Japan, 1582-1941: Internal and External Worlds. Cambridge: Cambridge University Press. ; ;  OCLC 50694793
 Hayashi, Shihei. (1786). . Edo: Manuscript. OCLC 44014900
 Klaproth, Julius. (1832). San kokf tsou ran to sets, ou Aperçu général des trois royaumes. Paris: Oriental Translation Fund of Great Britain and Ireland. OCLC 2563166; also OCLC 561284561

External links 
 Waseda University — Hayashi Shihei. (1785). 三国通覧図説 (Sangoku Tsuran Zusetsu)
 Maps of Ezo, Sakhalin, and Kuril Islands from 1854